Simanta Express (train No. 747/748) is an intercity train from Chilahati to Khulna. The train is conducted by Bangladesh Railway. The train serves from South-Western Bengal to North Bengal. Apart from the Simanta Express, the Rupsha Express also runs on this route.

Routes 
The route from Chilahati to Khulna is the longest route of Bangladesh Railway.

Timing 
The train starts its journey from Khulna at 9:00 am and reaches the destination of Chilahati at 6:20 pm. Again it starts from Chilahati at 7:00 am and reaches at 4:30 pm to Khulna.

Halts 
Simanta Express departs at the following stations:
 Jessore railway station
 Kot Chandpur station
 Darshan Holt railway station
 Chuadanga railway station
 Alamdanga railway station
 Torada railway station
 Veramara railway station
 Pakshi railway station
 Ishwardi railway station
 Natore railway station
 Ahsanganj railway station
 Santaher railway station
 Akkelpur railway station
 Joypurhat railway station
 Birampur railway station
 Phulbari railway station
 Parbatipur railway station
 Saidpur railway station
 Nilphamari railway station
 Domar railway station

References 

Passenger rail transport in Bangladesh